Chan Yik Yan (陳亦人, Chen Yi Ren) 1909-1982 was a disciple of Liuhebafa Master Wu Yi Hui.  Although Wu Yi Hui taught many students, it's only Chan Yik Yan who is known to have completed the entire Liuhebafa system.  

Chan Yik Yan taught Liuhebafa in Hong Kong and Singapore. Although he instructed numerous students Chan Yik Yan was known to have only accepted 6 Disciples into the Liuhebafa lineage.  

Disciples of Chan Yik Yan, in chronological order of their acceptance (6):

 Lung Wah (Long Hua)
 Jau Mui Tin (Zhou Mei Tian)
 Poon Yi (Pan Yi)
 Ho Moon Cheung (He Man Xiang)
 Choi Wai Lun (Cai Hui Lin)
 Mok Kei Fai (Mo Chi Hui)

See also
Wu Yi Hui
Liuhebafa
Kung Fu

External links and sources
The website of Wai Lun Choi, disciple of Chan Yik Yan
The website of Mok Kei Fai, disciple of Chan Yik Yan

1909 births
1982 deaths